Superorganism are an indie pop band based in London, formed in early 2017. The group originally consisted of eight members: lead vocalist Orono Noguchi, as well as Emily, Harry, Tucan, Robert Strange, Ruby, B, and Soul.

Many of the group's members originally met online before forming the group, while four of their members previously performed together as the Eversons.  Their self-titled debut album, Superorganism, was released on 2 March 2018 through Domino Recording Company and Hostess Entertainment.

Career 

Superorganism initially started as a casual recording project with members based in multiple countries across the United Kingdom, the United States, and Australia. Most of the members of Superorganism had met online in music forums and via mutual friends over a number of years. At the time of Superorganism's formation, the majority of the members had been living in London since 2015 and decided to embark on a musical project together.

Four of the members – Mark Turner (Emily), Christopher Young (Harry), Timothy "Tim" Shann (Tucan), and Blair Everson (Robert Strange), had previously met Orono Noguchi when they were touring Japan in another band called the Eversons. Noguchi, at the time a high school student from Maine, had first discovered the Eversons via her YouTube recommendations, thereafter becoming a fan of the group. During a 2015 summer trip to Japan, Noguchi found the Eversons to be performing a gig nearby and attended. They became friends, bonding over their shared interest in internet memes.

After discovering Noguchi could sing (she had been regularly posting covers on SoundCloud), the group sent a message to Noguchi, asking if she wanted to add lyrics and vocals to a demo they had been working on at the beginning of 2017. Collaborating on their project remotely, Noguchi received a GarageBand instrumental file and sent back to the band her deadpan vocals recorded using the built-in microphone of her MacBook laptop. The demo came to be Superorganism's first single "Something For Your M.I.N.D.", which was later featured on the soundtrack of FIFA 18. It also featured during the season three premiere of Legion, in which the band portrayed themselves.

After graduating from John Bapst Memorial High School in June, seventeen-year-old Noguchi relocated to London. "Ever since I was little I had two big goals," says Noguchi, "One of them was to be a musician or an artist of some sort, and the other was to go to college in the States. That’s why I made the decision to go to Maine by myself when I was fourteen." In regards to college, she said, "[Forming Superorganism] was a really big decision but you don’t get to decide when opportunities come. So I'll do this, and I can go to college any time I want."

Robert Strange was Superorganism's original visual artist. As of late 2017, seven out of eight band members lived together in a large terraced house in the East End of London that doubles as a 24-hour studio.

South Korean New Zealand background vocalist Soul (Earl Ho), is the only member to live apart from the group, residing in Sydney, Australia. An enlarged image of Soul's face often takes his place in group photographs. Going by the project name "CHI", Soul has also released material to a Bandcamp account of his own, playing the guitar and keyboard himself.

In June 2018, Superorganism covered Hikaru Utada's  as promotion for the release of her album Hatsukoi (2018).

In October 2018, Superorganism embarked on a tour of the UK and Ireland with Japanese band Chai as their support.

In January 2019, the Eversons were dumped from their record label, Lil' Chief Records, due to allegations dating from 2012 against Mark Turner (Emily), that "became common knowledge among the New Zealand indie music scene." The label released a statement saying they were against sexual misconduct and apologised unreservedly for not acting sooner. Some songs by the Eversons were controversial in New Zealand for their misogynistic and offensive content.

Superorganism contributed the song "Hello Me & You" to the soundtrack of the film The Lego Movie 2: The Second Part, released in February 2019.

On 7 March 2022, Superorganism announced their second studio album, World Wide Pop, with a 15 July release date, alongside the release of the single "Teenager". It was also announced that Ruby, Turner and Robert Strange had left the band.

Members
Current members
 Orono Noguchi, also known as "OJ" – vocals, writing, painting (2017–present)
 Tucan, or Dr. Tucan Taylor Michaels (Timothy "Tim" Shann) – writing, production, mixing, drums (2017–present)
 Harry (Christopher Young) – writing, production, guitar (2017–present)
 B – background vocals, background dancing, background musician (2017–present)
 Soul (Earl Ho) – background vocals, background dancing, background musician (2017–present)

Former members
 Emily (Mark David Turner) – writing, production, synths (2017–2022)
 Ruby – background vocals, background dancing, background musician (2017–2022)
 Robert Strange (Blair Everson) – visual arts, staging (2017–2022)

Discography

Albums

Singles

Music videos

Awards and nominations

References

External links 
 

Domino Recording Company artists
English pop rock music groups
Musical groups established in 2017
Musical groups from London
2017 establishments in England
British indie pop groups